Roger Tauss is a Swiss retired slalom canoeist who competed from the late 1940s to the late 1950s. He won a silver medal at the 1957 ICF Canoe Slalom World Championships in Augsburg.

References

Swiss male canoeists
Possibly living people
Year of birth missing (living people)
Medalists at the ICF Canoe Slalom World Championships